Unraveller or Unraveler may refer to:

 The Unraveller, a deity in the novel series The Fionavar Tapestry by Guy Gavriel Kay
 Unraveller, a fictional entity in the novel Darkfall by Isobelle Carmody
 Unraveller, a young adult fantasy novel by Frances Hardinge

See also
 Unravel (disambiguation)
 Unraveled (disambiguation)
 Unravelling (disambiguation)